Glenford, a male given name, may refer to one of the following:

Glenford Baptist, Belizean prisoner, who became Belize's longest serving death row inmate
Glenford Eckleton Mitchell, member of the Universal House of Justice, the supreme governing body of the Bahá'í Faith
Glenford Myers, American computer scientist, entrepreneur, and author
Glenford Spencer, Jamaican criminal and member of the Yardies
Glen Tetley, born Glenford Andrew Tetley (1926–2007), American ballet and modern dancer

See also
Glenn Ford
Glenn Ford (disambiguation)

Masculine given names